Jason Chan (born 12 August 1996) is a Canadian-Australian ice dancer who currently represents Australia. With partner Holly Harris, he is the 2019 Australian national senior champion.

With former partner Valérie Taillefer he was the 2014 Canadian novice dance champion.

Career

Early career 
In 2011, Chan trained in Montreal with Valérie Taillefer, competing at the pre-novice level in the Canadian national skating championships in Regina.  At the novice level at the 2014 Canadian Championships, the pair won the gold medal. The pair also competed in the Skate Canada Challenge in Regina that year and took first place in the novice dance category.  Taillefer/Chan competed for three seasons on the ISU Junior Grand Prix, before the end of their partnership.

2019–20 season: Debut of Harris/Chan 
Chan formed a dance partnership with Australian ice dancer Holly Harris to represent her country and began training at the Ice Academy of Montreal under coaches Marie-France Dubreuil, Patrice Lauzon, and Romain Haguenauer.

Harris/Chan debuted internationally on the Challenger series at the 2019 CS Warsaw Cup, where they placed ninth, in the process defeating reigning Australian national champions Kerry/Dodds (in eleventh place) by almost 25 points.  They went on to win the Australian national title.  Harris/Chan made their ISU Championship debut at the 2020 Four Continents Championships in Seoul, where they placed ninth.  They were assigned to compete at the World Championships in Montreal, but these were cancelled as a result of the coronavirus pandemic.

2020–21 season 
Harris/Chan were assigned to make their Grand Prix debut at the 2020 Skate Canada International, but this event was also cancelled as a result of the coronavirus pandemic. They made their World Championship debut at the 2021 World Championships in Stockholm, placing twenty-fourth.

2021–22 season 
Harris/Chan began the season at the Skating Club of Boston-hosted Lake Placid Ice Dance International, where they finished in fourth place. They then were assigned to the 2021 CS Nebelhorn Trophy, seeking to qualify a berth for Australia at the 2022 Winter Olympics. They finished in ninth place, making Australia the fourth reserve. Harris/Chan competed at two more Challenger events, finishing thirteenth at the 2021 CS Finlandia Trophy and seventh at the 2021 CS Golden Spin of Zagreb. They then won the bronze medal at the Santa Claus Cup.

Assigned to the 2022 Four Continents Championships in Tallinn, Harris/Chan finished in eighth place. The team concluded the season at the 2022 World Championships, held in Montpellier with Russian dance teams absent due to the International Skating Union banning all Russian athletes due to their country's invasion of Ukraine. Harris/Chan qualified to the free dance for the first time, coming in eighteenth place.

2022–23 season 
Appearing at the inaugural Britannia Cup, Harris/Chan won the bronze medal. They were seventh at the 2022 CS Nebelhorn Trophy. They were invited to make their Grand Prix debut at the 2022 Skate America, where they finished fourth in the rhythm dance and set a new personal best, clearing the 70-point mark for the first time. They finished fifth overall after errors in the free dance. The following weekend, they were eighth at the 2022 Skate Canada International, their second Grand Prix. After the Grand Prix, Harris/Chan won gold at the Santa Claus Cup and came seventh at the 2022 CS Golden Spin of Zagreb.

Harris/Chan finished eighth at the 2023 Four Continents Championships.

Programs

With Harris

Competitive highlights 
CS: Challenger Series; GP: Grand Prix; JGP: Junior Grand Prix

With Harris for Australia

With Taillefer for Canada

References 

1996 births
Living people
Australian male ice dancers
Canadian male ice dancers